James Marshall Stewart (9 August 1861 – 20 July 1943) was an English first-class cricketer active 1877–80 who played for Middlesex. He was born in Glasgow; died in Whitchurch.

References

1861 births
1943 deaths
English cricketers
Middlesex cricketers